JS was an American female R&B duo. The duo consisted of members Kim Johnson and Kandy Johnson.

JS began as a gospel duo, singing first in church and then with touring gospel artists such as Andrae Crouch and Shirley Caesar. The group also appeared on television, on Ally McBeal and The Oprah Winfrey Show. In 2001, the group came under the management of The Isley Brothers and appeared on their Eternal (2001) and Body Kiss (2003) albums. In 2003 they released their own album, Ice Cream, which spawned the hits "Ice Cream" (US #124) and "Love Angel". They were featured on the single "Busted" (US #113) from The Isley Brothers' album Body Kiss, which was billed as The Isley Brothers featuring JS.

Discography
 Ice Cream (2003) U.S. #33

References

American girl groups